Consalvi is a surname. Notable people with the surname include:

Achille Consalvi, Italian actor and film director
Ercole Consalvi (1757–1824), Italian Roman Catholic cardinal
Simón Alberto Consalvi (1927–2013), Venezuelan journalist, diplomat, politician, and historian

See also
Consalvo